Tablet weaving (often card weaving in the United States) is a weaving technique where tablets or cards are used to create the shed through which the weft is passed.  As the materials and tools are relatively cheap and easy to obtain, tablet weaving is popular with hobbyist weavers.  Currently most tablet weavers produce narrow work such as belts, straps, or garment trims.

History 

Tablet weaving dates back at least to the 8th century BCE in early Iron Age Europe where it is found in areas employing the warp-weighted loom. Historically the technique served several purposes: to create starting and/or selvedge bands for larger textiles such as those produced on the warp-weighted loom; to weave decorative bands onto existing textiles; and to create freestanding narrow work.

Early examples have been found at Hochdorf, Germany, and Apremont, Haute-Saône, France, as well as in Italy, Greece, and Austria. Elaborate tablet-woven bands are found in many high status Iron Age and medieval graves of Europe as well as in the Roman period in the Near East. They are presumed to have been standard trim for garments among various European peoples, including the Vikings. Many museum examples exist of such bands used on ecclesiastical textiles or as the foundation for elaborate belts in the European Middle Ages. In the 17th century, tablet weaving was also used to produce some monumental silk hangings in Ethiopia.

Tablet weaving is often erroneously believed to date back to pharaonic Egypt. This theory was advanced early in the 20th century based on an elaborate woven belt of uncertain provenance, often called the Girdle of Rameses, as it bore an inked cartouche of Rameses III. Arnold van Gennep and G. Jéquier published a book in 1916, predicated on the assumption that the ancient Egyptians were familiar with tablet weaving. Scholars argued spiritedly about the production method of the belt for decades. Many popular books on tablet weaving promoted the Egyptian origin theory until, in an appendix to his book The Techniques of Tablet Weaving, Peter Collingwood proved by structural analysis that the linen belt could not have been woven on tablets.

Tools for tablet weaving 

The tablets used in weaving are typically shaped as regular polygons, with holes near each vertex and possibly at the center, as well. The number of holes in the tablets used is a limiting factor on the complexity of the pattern woven. The corners of the tablets are typically rounded to prevent catching as they are rotated during weaving.

In the past, weavers made tablets from bark, wood, bone, horn, stone, leather, metal or a variety of other materials. Modern cards are frequently made from cardboard. Some weavers even drill holes in a set of playing cards. This is an easy way to get customized tablets or large numbers of inexpensive tablets.

The tablets are usually marked with colors or stripes so that their facings and orientations can be easily noticed.

Procedure 

The fundamental principle is to turn the tablets to lift selected sets of threads in the warp.  The tablets may be turned in one direction continually as a pack, turned individually to create patterns, or turned some number of times "forward" and the same number "back".  Twisting the tablets in only one direction can create a ribbon that curls in the direction of the twist, though there are ways to thread the tablets that mitigate this issue.

Some weavers prefer the backstrap method of weaving, where one end of the warp was tucked into (or wrapped around) the weaver's belt and the other is looped over a toe/tied to a pole or furniture. Other weavers prefer to use "Inkle" looms, which are a more modern invention and act as both loom and warping board for the project.  Some traditional weavers weave between two poles and wrap the weft around the poles (similar to the Oseberg loom found in Norway dating from the 9th century).  Commercial "tablet weaving looms" adapt this idea and are convenient because they make it easy to put the work down.

Some patterns require that weavers thread each card individually. Others allow "continuous warping", which puts the threads through the holes of an entire deck – the four threads in the deck of cards are wrapped around two stationary objects, dropping one card each time around the fixed points. Cards are threaded in either S (in through the right of the card) or Z (in through the left of the card) directions, which alters the pattern created by turning the cards.

Shuttles made for tablet weaving have tapered edges to beat down the weft. Simple flat wooden or plastic shuttles work well for weaving any kind yarn from wool to cotton to silk.

Patterns are made by placing different-colored yarns in different holes, then turning individual cards until the desired colors of the weft are on top.  After that, a simple pattern, like a stripe, small diamond or check, can be repeated just by turning the deck of tablets.

Tablet weaving is especially freeing, because any pattern can be created by turning individual tablets.  This is in contrast to normal looms, in which the complexity of the pattern is limited by the number of shafts available to lift threads, and the threading of the heddles.

Tablet weaving can also be used to weave tubes or double weave.  The tablets are made to have four levels in the warp, and then two sheds are beat and wefted, one in the top pair of warps, and the other in the bottom pair, before turning the deck.  Since groups of tablets can be turned separately, the length, width and joining of the tubes can be controlled by the weaver.

See also 
 Inkle weaving

References 

Weaving